Payal Arora is an Indian anthropologist, full Professor and Chair in Technology, Values, and Global Media Cultures at Erasmus University Rotterdam, author and consultant. She is the founder of CatalystLab, an organization that connects academia, business and the public on social issues. Her work focuses on internet usage in the Global South, specifically on digital cultures, inequality and data governance.

Career 
Arora authored and co-edited numerous books and gave dozens of talks around the world, including a TEDx talk on the future of the internet. Forbes called her “next billion champion” in reference to her book “The Next Billion Users: Digital Life Beyond the West” which examines the online behavior of citizens in India, China, South Africa, Brazil, and the Middle East. The book has been featured by publications such as The Economist, TechCrunch and Frankfurter Allgemeine Zeitung. Arora is a member of several boards and advisory committees, including Facebook's Social Science One. In 2017 her teaching was awarded with the  Erasmus University Rotterdam's Education Prize. She holds a Master's degree in International Development Policy from Harvard University and a doctoral degree in Language, Literacy & Technology from Columbia University.

Bibliography

References

External links 

Living people
Digital media educators
Harvard University alumni
Columbia Graduate School of Arts and Sciences alumni
Academic staff of Erasmus University Rotterdam
Indian social sciences writers
Indian women anthropologists
Indian anthropologists
Year of birth missing (living people)